What's On My Mind? is the debut studio album by American rap group The Dayton Family from Flint, Michigan. It was released in 1994 through Po' Broke/Relativity Records. Production was handled by the Dayton Family and Steve Pitts.

Track listing

Chart history

References

External links

1995 debut albums
The Dayton Family albums